Punjab has a long history of education.

Primary and secondary education

The Indian government lays emphasis on the primary education up to the age of fourteen years, referred to as elementary education in India. It has been a fundamental right enlisted in the constitution of the country under Article 21-A up till the age of 14 years.  The Indian government has also banned child labour in order to ensure that the children do not enter unsafe working conditions. However, both free education and the ban on child labour are difficult to enforce due to economic disparity and social conditions. 80% of all recognized schools at the elementary stage are government run or supported, making it the largest provider of education in the country.

However, due to a shortage of resources and lack of political will, this system suffers from massive gaps including high pupil to teacher ratios, shortage of infrastructure and poor levels of teacher training. Figures released by the Indian government in 2011 show that there were 5,816,673 elementary school teachers in India. As of March 2012 there were 2,127,000 secondary school teachers in India.
Education has also been made free for children for 6 to 14 years of age or up to class VIII under the Right of Children to Free and Compulsory Education Act 2009.

There have been several efforts to enhance quality made by the government. The District Education Revitalization Programme (DERP) was launched in 1994 with an aim to universalize primary education in India by reforming and vitalizing the existing primary education system. 85% of the DERP was funded by the central government and the remaining 15 percent was funded by the states. The DERP, which had opened 160000 new schools including 84000 alternative education schools delivering alternative education to approximately 3.5 million children, was also supported by UNICEF and other international programmes.

This primary education scheme has also shown a high Gross Enrollment Ratio of 93–95% for the last three years in some states. Significant improvement in staffing and enrollment of girls has also been made as a part of this scheme. The current scheme for universalization of Education for All is the Sarva Shiksha Abhiyan which is one of the largest education initiatives in the world. Enrollment has been enhanced, but the levels of quality remain low.

Secondary education

The National Policy on Education (NPE), 1986, has provided for environment awareness, science and technology education, and introduction of traditional elements such as Yoga into the Indian secondary school system. Secondary education covers children aged 14 to 18, 88.5 million children according to the Census, 2001.

A significant feature of India's secondary school system is the emphasis on inclusion of the disadvantaged sections of the society. Professionals from established institutes are often called to support in vocational training. Another feature of India's secondary school system is its emphasis on profession based vocational training to help students attain skills for finding a vocation of his/her choosing. A significant new feature has been the extension of SSA to secondary education in the form of the Rashtriya Madhyamik Shiksha Abhiyan.

A special Integrated Education for Disabled Children (IEDC) programme was started in 1974 with a focus on primary education. but which was converted into Inclusive Education at Secondary Stage Another notable special programme, the Kendriya Vidyalaya project, was started for the employees of the central government of India, who are distributed throughout the country. The government started the Kendriya Vidyalaya project in 1965 to provide uniform education in institutions following the same syllabus at the same pace regardless of the location to which the employee's family has been transferred.

Schools of Repute
 Little Flower Convent School, Dhariwal
 Cambridge International school, Dasuya
 DAV Public School, Amritsar
 Doon International School, Amritsar
 Doon International school, Gurdaspur 
 DPS Ludhiana
 Government High Smart School Mauran, Barnala
 Guru Teg Bahadur International School, Dhariwal
 Indus World School, Ludhiana
 Kundan Vidya Mandir Sen Sec. School, Ludhiana
 Rayat International school, SBS Nagar
 Patel Memorial National College, Rajpura
 Ryan International School, Amritsar
 Ryan International School, Ludhiana
 Shivalik Public School, Mohali
 Sainik School, Kapurthala 
 Yadavindra Public School, Patiala
 Yadavindra Public School, Mohali
 The Punjab Public School, Nabha
 St.Xavier's High School, Rampuraphul

Tertiary education

Punjab is served by many public institutes of higher education (listed below). All the major arts, humanities, science, engineering, law, medicine, veterinary science, and business courses are offered, leading to first degrees as well as postgraduate awards. Advanced research is conducted in all major areas of excellence. Punjab Agricultural University is one of the world's leading authorities in agriculture. It was instrumental and played vital role in Punjab's Green Revolution in the 1960s-70s.

Universities

Central 
Central University of Punjab, Bathinda

State 

Panjab University, Chandigarh (a Punjab State University)
Baba Farid University of Health Sciences, Faridkot
Guru Nanak Dev University, Amritsar
[
ar.com/news/20140723/1/627869.cms#627869}}</ref> Jalandhar
Maharaja Ranjit Singh Punjab Technical University, Bathinda
Punjabi University, Patiala
Punjabi University Regional Centre for IT and Management, Mohali 
Punjabi University Guru Kashi Campus, Talwandi Sabo
Guru Ravidas Ayurved University, Hoshiarpur
Guru Angad Dev Veterinary and Animal Sciences University, Ludhiana
Sri Guru Teg Bahadur State University of Law, Taran Taran
Rajiv Gandhi National University of Law, Patiala
Jagat Guru Nanak Dev Punjab State Open University

Private 
Adesh University, Bathinda
Thapar University
Apeejay Institute of Management
Sri Guru Granth Sahib World University, Fatehgarh Sahib
GGS College of Modern Technology, Kharar
Indian School of Business, Ajitgarh
Guru Kashi University, Talwandi Sabo
DAV University, Jalandhar
GNA University, Phagwara
Sant Baba Bhag Singh University, Jalandhar
Akal University

Deemed 

Sant Longowal Institute of Engineering and Technology, Longowal(Deemed)
Thapar Institute of Engineering and Technology, Patiala(Deemed)

Autonomous colleges in Punjab

Many colleges of Punjab have been granted autonomous status by UGC.
Khalsa College, Amritsar
Mata Gujri College, Fatehgarh Sahib
S.G.G.S. Khalsa College, Mahilpur (Hoshiarpur district)
Amritsar College of Engineering & Technology
Beant College of Engineering and Technology Gurdaspur
Shaheed Bhagat Singh State Technical Campus, Ferozepur
Guru Nanak Dev Engineering College, Ludhiana

Reputed colleges (Technical /Professional)

Apeejay Institute of Management & Engineering Technical Campus, Jalandhar (Punjab)
Sikh Missionary College, Ludhiana
 Desh Bhagat Group of Institutes, Gobindgarh, Moga, Muktsar under Desh Bhagat University
Indian Institute of Technology, Ropar
Indian Institute of Management Amritsar
Indian Institute of Science Education and Research, Mohali
Dr B R Ambedkar National Institute of Technology, Jalandhar
 Global Institute of Management & Emerging Technologies, Amritsar
Institute of Nano Science and Technology
Giani Zail Singh Punjab Technical University Campus (Government Engineering College), Bathinda 
Yadavindra College of Engineering, Punjabi University Guru Kashi Campus, Talwandi Sabo
Malout institute of Management & Technology, Malout ( Govt. of Punjab)
Bhutta College of Engineering & Technology, Ludhiana
Malwa College of Nursing
Baba Banda Singh Bahadur Engineering college,Fatehgarh Sahib
Sri Sukhmani Institute of Engineering & Technology, Dera Bassi(Mohali)

Other Institutes of Repute (General)
 Aryabhatta group of institutions, Barnala
 BBK DAV College for Women, Amritsar
 BCM College of Education, Ludhiana
 College of Engineering and Management, Kapurthala
Patel Memorial National College, Rajpura
 Council of Computer Education Research and Training, Ludhiana
 Desh Bhagat Group of Institutes, Gobindgarh, Moga, Muktsar under Desh Bhagat University
 [Doraha college of Education, Doraha]
 GHG Khalsa College of Education, GURUSAR Sudhar
 Govt. Bikram College of Commerce, Patiala
 Govt. College of Education, Sector 20 Chandigarh
 Govt. Barjinder College, Faridkot
 Desh Bhagat Pt. Chetan Dev Govt.College of Education, Faridkot
 Malwa Group of Institutions
 Khalsa College, Patiala
 Kings Group of Institutions, Barnala,Punjab
 Malwa College of Nursing, Kotkapura
 Mohindra College, Patiala
 PCTE Group of Institutes (including Punjab College of Technical Education), Ludhiana
 Punjab Engineering College, Chandigarh
 Regional Centre Punjabi University, Bathinda
 SGGS Khalsa College Sector 26 Chandigarh
 State College of Education, Patiala
 Swami Sarvanand Giri Panjab University Regional Centre, Hoshiarpur

Medical Colleges
As of 2015, there are more than 920 MBBS and 1,070 BDS seats across Punjab.

Government Medical Colleges
 Government Medical College, Amritsar
 Guru Gobind Singh Medical College, Faridkot
 Government Medical College, Patiala
 Dr. B.R. Ambedkar State Institute of Medical Sciences, Mohali

Private Medical Colleges
 Gian Sagar Medical College & Hospital, Patiala	
 Sri Guru Ram Das Institute of Medical Sciences & Research, Sri Amritsar
 Punjab Institute of Medical Sciences, Jalandhar
 Christian Medical College, Ludhiana
 Dayanand Medical College & Hospital, Ludhiana
 Adesh Institute of Medical Sciences & Research, Bathinda
 Chintpurni Medical College, Gurdaspur
 Desh Bhagat School of Medical Sciences, Mandi Gobindgarh Desh Bhagat University

Notable people
 The former Prime Minister of India, Dr Manmohan Singh was educated at Panjab University, Chandigarh and Oxford and Cambridge in UK.
 Professor Har Gobind Khorana, famous Nobel laureate & biotechnologist was educated at Panjab University.
 Sushma Swaraj Leader of BJP is an alumnus of Panjab University Chandigarh
IAS officer of 1989-batch, Iqbal Singh Chahal is the current BMC commissioner is an alumnus of Thapar Institute of Engineering and Technology Patiala
Subodh Kumar Jaiswal, the current CBI director from May 2021, is an MBA postgraduate from University Business School, Panjab University Chandigarh

References